was a Japanese mathematician who worked in the field of functional analysis. He is known for the Hille-Yosida theorem concerning C0-semigroups. Yosida studied mathematics at the University of Tokyo, and held posts at Osaka and Nagoya Universities. In 1955, Yosida returned to the University of Tokyo.

See also 
 Einar Carl Hille
 Functional analysis

References 

 Kôsaku Yosida: Functional analysis. Grundlehren der mathematischen Wissenschaften 123, Springer-Verlag, 1971 (3rd ed.), 1974 (4th ed.), 1978 (5th ed.), 1980 (6th ed.)

External links 
Photo
 Kosaku Yosida / School of Mathematics and Statistics University of St Andrews, Scotland
 94. Normed Rings and Spectral Theorems, II. By Kôsaku YOSIDA. Mathematical Inlstitute, Nagoya Imperial University. (Comm. by T.TAKAGMI, M.I.A. Oct.12,1943.)

 Kosaku Yosida (1909 - 1990) - Biography - MacTutor

1909 births
1990 deaths
20th-century Japanese mathematicians
Mathematical analysts
Functional analysts
Operator theorists
Approximation theorists
University of Tokyo alumni
Academic staff of the University of Tokyo
Academic staff of Osaka University
Academic staff of Nagoya University
Laureates of the Imperial Prize